The 2010 San Marino CEPU Open was a professional tennis tournament played on outdoor red clay courts. It was the twenty second edition of the tournament which is part of the Tretorn SERIE+ of the 2010 ATP Challenger Tour. It took place in City of San Marino, San Marino between 2 and 8 August 2010.

ATP entrants

Seeds

 Rankings are as of July 26, 2010.

Other entrants
The following players received wildcards into the singles main draw:
  Daniele Bracciali
  Flavio Cipolla
  Matteo Trevisan
  Diego Zonzini

The following players received a Special Exempt into the main draw:
  Leonardo Tavares

The following players received entry from the qualifying draw:
  Andrea Arnaboldi
  Nikola Ćirić
  Janez Semrajc
  Adelchi Virgili

Champions

Singles

 Robin Haase def.  Filippo Volandri, 6–2, 7–6(8)

Doubles

 Daniele Bracciali /  Lovro Zovko def.  Yves Allegro /  James Cerretani, 3–6, 6–2, [10–5]

External links
Official website
ITF Search 
2010 Draws

San Marino CEPU Open
San Marino CEPU Open
Clay court tennis tournaments
2010 in San Marino